The 2012 Internationaux de Strasbourg was a professional tennis tournament played on clay courts. It was the 26th edition of the tournament which was part of the 2012 WTA Tour. It took place in Strasbourg, France between 19 and 26 May 2012.

Singles main draw entrants

Seeds

Rankings are as of 14 May 2012

Other entrants
The following players received wildcards into the singles main draw:
  Alizé Cornet
  Sabine Lisicki
  Virginie Razzano

The following players received entry from the qualifying draw:
  Lauren Davis 
  Mirjana Lučić
  Alexandra Panova
  Anastasija Sevastova

The following players received entry as lucky losers:
  María José Martínez Sánchez
  Mandy Minella

Withdrawals
  Flavia Pennetta (wrist injury)
  Klára Zakopalová (sickness)
  Elena Vesnina (right wrist injury)

Retirements
  Maria Kirilenko (right ankle injury)
  Anastasija Sevastova (low back injury)

Doubles main draw entrants

Seeds

1 Rankings are as of 14 May 2012

Retirements
  Alberta Brianti (left calf injury)

Finals

Singles

 Francesca Schiavone defeated  Alizé Cornet, 6–4, 6–4
 It was Schiavone's 1st singles title of the year and the 5th of her career

Doubles

 Olga Govortsova /  Klaudia Jans-Ignacik defeated  Natalie Grandin /  Vladimíra Uhlířová, 6–7(4–7), 6–3, [10–3]

References

External links
 

Internationaux de Strasbourg
Internationaux de Strasbourg
2012 in French tennis
May 2012 sports events in France